Raywell is a hamlet in the East Riding of Yorkshire, England. 

It is located on the crossroads of Westfields Road and Riplingham Road. These roads link Riplingham (South Cave), Eppleworth (Cottingham) and Kirk Ella.

Raywell forms part of the civil parish of Skidby. It consists of a farm and an old manor house. It is noted as a local Scout/Girl guides site. Locally it is also noted because of a number of walks that start there.

References

Hamlets in the East Riding of Yorkshire